Épinoy is a commune in the Pas-de-Calais department in the Hauts-de-France region of France.

Geography

Population

Places of interest
 Traces of an old castle.
 The church of St. Nicholas, rebuilt, as was most of the village, after World War I.

See also
Communes of the Pas-de-Calais department

References

External links

 Sucrerie CWGC cemetery at Épinoy

Communes of Pas-de-Calais